"Death of a Clown" is a song by Dave Davies, member of British rock group the Kinks, released as his debut solo single in 1967. The song was co-written with his brother Ray Davies, who contributed the 5-bar "La la la" hook; Ray's first wife, Rasa, sings this phrase as well as descant in the second verse, while Ray himself sings harmony in the refrain. Nicky Hopkins played the distinctive introduction, using fingerpicks on the strings of a piano. The single was credited to Dave Davies but the song also appeared on the Kinks' album Something Else by the Kinks, released later in 1967.

Background
In an interview with Yahoo!, Dave Davies said that "Death of a Clown" was written about the repetitive performing schedule he and the rest of the Kinks worked through. He said, "One night I nodded off at a party and woke up and saw all these decadent people running around. I had a vision of being a circus clown. I thought, 'What are we doing?' We were going from day to day to day like performing seals. And that's where I got the idea for 'Death of a Clown.' I went back to me mum's house with the same old out-of-tune piano and I plunked out three notes, and it turned into the song."

The single release was met with considerable success in the UK, hitting No. 3, thus prompting Dave Davies to consider embarking on a solo career. When subsequent singles were met with less success, the idea was set aside until 1980, with his debut album being AFL1-3603.

Personnel
According to band researcher Doug Hinman:

The Kinks
Dave Davies lead vocal, electric guitar
Ray Davies backing vocal, acoustic guitar
Pete Quaife bass
Mick Avory drums

Additional musicians
Rasa Davies backing vocal
Nicky Hopkins piano

Charts

References

Sources

 

The Kinks songs
1967 debut singles
Song recordings produced by Shel Talmy
Songs written by Ray Davies
Songs written by Dave Davies
Pye Records singles
1967 songs